Othon or Othón may refer to:

Othon Mataragas (born 1979), Greek composer, songwriter and pianist
Charles Othon Frédéric Jean-Baptiste de Clarac (1777–1847), French artist, scholar and archaeologist
Le Tilleul-Othon, commune in the Eure department in Haute-Normandie in northern France
Othón P. Blanco, Quintana Roo, one of the eight subdivisions of the Mexican state of Quintana Roo
Othón P. Blanco Núñez de Cáceres (1868–1959), Mexican Marine and the founder of the city of Chetumal
Othon Bastos (born 1933), Brazilian film actor
Othon Friesz (1879–1949), native of Le Havre, French artist of the Fauvist movement
Othon Henri del Caretto, Marquis of Savona (1629–1685), Imperial Army commander and political figure
Quentin Othon (born 1988), French footballer currently playing for RC Strasbourg
Otto of Greece (1815–1867), also called Othon, King of Greece
Othon (Brazilian footballer) (born 1944), full name Othon Valentim Filho, Brazilian footballer